Justin Paulo Cuyugan (born October 11, 1980) is a Filipino actor.

Career
Cuyugan was one of the new talents launched by ABS-CBN's talent management arm Star Magic, then Star Circle, in 1999.

In 2017, Cuyugan appeared as Emil Verdadero in Pusong Ligaw. With his wife Carmi and son Lucas, participated in the second season of the Philippine version of the game show Bet on Your Baby.

Cuyugan played the demon Gaki in the fantasy series Bagani in 2018.

Personal life

Cuyugan was married to Carmi until her death to ovarian cancer. The couple has three children.

Cuyugan is previously in a relationship with actress and former GirlTrends member Dawn Chang.

Filmography

Television

Film

External links

References

Living people
Filipino male television actors
ABS-CBN personalities
Star Magic
21st-century Filipino male actors
1980 births